Kingham is a village and civil parish in the Cotswolds about  southwest of Chipping Norton, Oxfordshire. The 2011 Census recorded the parish's population as 913.

Toponym
The Domesday Book of 1086 records the toponym as Caningeham. Another 11th-century document records it as Keingeham. A charter from 1160 records it as Kaingham, as do numerous subsequent documents until 1251. A charter from 1160 and a pipe roll entry for 1163 record it as Caingeham. A charter of Osney Abbey from 1210 records it as Kangham. The Book of Fees records it as Kaingeham in entries for 1220 and 1242 and Keingham or Keyngham in entries for 1235–36. A feet of fines entry for 1254 records it as Kengham: a spelling that was frequent until 1377, when it was used in a Close Roll entry. An assize roll from 1268 records it as Kehingham. A charter of Eynsham Abbey from 1285 records it as Canyngesham, but an assize roll from the same year records it as Kyngham. The latter spelling remained in frequent use until 1428, when it was used in a feudal aid document. An earlier feudal aid document, from 1346, records it as Keygham. The name is derived from Old English, meaning "the hām (homestead) of Cǣga's people".

Parish church
The Church of England parish church of St Andrew has a 14th-century Perpendicular Gothic west tower with a 15th-century top. The chancel was rebuilt in 1688. In 1852–53 the church was heavily restored and the south aisle was added. The tower has a ring of eight bells, all cast in 1924 by John Taylor & Co of Loughborough. The church is a Grade II* listed building. Both The Rectory and the Old Rectory Cottage are 17th century.

Economic and social history
Building of the Oxford, Worcester and Wolverhampton Railway (OW&W) along the Evenlode Valley began in 1845 and was completed in 1853. It passes through the western part of Kingham parish but originally there was no station. The Great Western Railway took over the OW&W in 1862 and the Chipping Norton and Bourton lines in 1897. In 1909 the GWR renamed the junction station "Kingham". In 1962 British Railways closed the branch lines to Chipping Norton and Bourton-on-the-Water. BR later replaced the historic Kingham railway station building with a modern one. In 1955 the Royal Navy named a   after the village.

Amenities
Bus route X8 serves the railway station and village. Buses run peak hours only, Monday to Friday, to and from Chipping Norton via Churchill. Pulham's Coaches operates the route for Oxfordshire County Council. The village has two gastropubs: The Plough, beside the older village green, operates under Heston Blumenthal-trained chef Emily Watkins; and The Wild Rabbit (formerly The Tollgate) which is now part of Lady Carole Bamford's Daylesford Organic organisation. The village also has an hotel called The Mill House. The village has a county primary school. Kingham has a village shop and post office, a Royal British Legion club, a village hall, two village greens, a children's play park and a football field.

Twinning
Kingham is twinned with the village of Pont-à-Marcq near Lille in France.

In popular culture
In 2004 a Country Life panel judged Kingham to be "England's Favourite Village". Blur bass-player Alex James lives on a sheep and dairy farm outside the village and chronicles the experience in his column in The Independent. An episode of the BBC Three comedy This Country was also filmed at Kingham railway station.

References

Sources

External links

Kingham Parish Council

Civil parishes in Oxfordshire
Villages in Oxfordshire
West Oxfordshire District